Steven H. Stern (born October 30, 1968) is a member of the New York State Assembly, representing the 10th district, which includes portions of the towns of Babylon and Huntington in Suffolk County. A Democrat, Stern was first elected in 2018 through a special election.

Stern is from Holbrook, New York. He graduated from Tulane University and received his law degree from Western Michigan University, later becoming a partner at Davidow and Davidow in Islandia, New York where he focused on elder law. In 2005, Stern ran for the Suffolk County Legislature, and was reelected five times, serving until 2018.

When Congressman Steve Israel retired in 2016, Stern ran in the open Democratic primary to represent  in the United States House of Representatives, but lost the primary election to Tom Suozzi.

In 2018, Stern was recruited to run in and won a special election to succeed Chad Lupinacci in the New York State Assembly, becoming the first Democrat to win the district in 40 years. He was re-elected in the 2018 general election with 59.9% of the vote. He ran for re-election again in the 2020 general election. He was re-elected to his second full term with 56.4% of the vote. He was again re-elected in 2022. 

Stern currently lives in Dix Hills, New York.

References

Living people
New York (state) Democrats
New York (state) lawyers
21st-century American politicians
People from Dix Hills, New York
County legislators in New York (state)
Western Michigan University Cooley Law School alumni
Tulane University alumni
1979 births